Guaiol or champacol is an organic compound, a sesquiterpenoid alcohol found in several plants, especially in the oil of guaiacum and cypress pine. It is a crystalline solid that melts at 92 °C. Guaiol is one of many terpenes found in Cannabis and it has been associated with anxiolytic activity.

Reactions

Guaiol yields a deep purple color when treated with electrophilic bromine reagents.

See also
 Guaiene

References

Tertiary alcohols
Sesquiterpenes